Vegavaram is a village in Eluru district of the Indian state of Andhra Pradesh. It is administered under of Eluru revenue division.

Demographics 

 Census of India, Vegavaram has population of 2648 of which 1290 are males while 1358 are females. Average Sex Ratio is 1053. Population of children with age 0-6 is 332 which makes up 12.54% of total population of village, Child sex ratio is 107. Literacy rate of the village was 67.44%.

References

Villages in Eluru district